Citadellet (Citadel) was a 19th-century Norwegian fortress. The last day of military activity was in 1970. The fort was demolished in 1971.

Citadellet  was intended to protect the Royal Norwegian Navy's Karljohansvern naval station in Horten. Karjohansvern was the main base for the Royal Norwegian Navy from 1819 to 1963.  The fortress was built between 1848 and 1851. Its architect was Christian Heinrich Grosch (1801-1865). The fort were established in conjunction with Norske Løve Fortress which was built between 1852 and 1859. Specific plans for the design of both fortifications were first completed in the mid-1830s, based upon designs largely begun in the 1820s. The forts were expected to assume a key role as defender of the fleet and defense against attacks from the sea.

Gallery

References

External links
Article by the Norwegian Armed Forces 

Forts in Norway
Horten
Royal Norwegian Navy
Military installations in Vestfold og Telemark
Demolished buildings and structures in Norway
Buildings and structures demolished in 1971